DXBN-TV (channel 9), was a television station of Butuan City Fil-Products and affiliate of People's Television Network. Its studio, transmitter and broadcast facility are located at Libertad, Butuan. Currently the station is inactive.

History
April 27, 1960 - DXBN-TV channel 9 was originally used by ABS-CBN, the first television station in Caraga, was launched by CBN (later merging into ABS-CBN from ABS).
1973 - During the declaration of Martial Law by then-President Ferdinand Marcos, and takeover of ABS-CBN by his crony, Roberto Benedicto, DXBN-TV was reopened and became part of the Banahaw Broadcasting Corporation.
1986 - DXBN-TV channel 9 was launched by GMA Network as an affiliate station of the Butuan City Fil-Products.
1995 - DXBN-TV channel 9 became an affiliate station of the People's Television Network, Inc. (PTNI) under Butuan City Fil-Products. The same year, GMA Butuan was also launched on Channel 7 under its affiliate, Northern Mindanao Broadcasting System (later it moved its regional station to UHF Channel 26 in 2015) and ABS-CBN Butuan started its broadcasting on Channel 11 in 1999 until it became a semi-satellite station of Channel 4 Cagayan de Oro (formerly TV-2), effective from July 2018 to August 2020.
July 16, 2001 - Under the new management appointed by the former President Gloria Macapagal Arroyo, PTNI adopted the name National Broadcasting Network (NBN) carrying new slogan "One People. One Nation. One Vision." for a new image in line with its new programming thrusts, they continued the new name until the Aquino administration in 2010.
2011 - After it was lasted for sixteen years in Butuan, the station is currently off the air.

Television stations in Butuan
People's Television Network stations
Television channels and stations established in 1960